Fanny Cano Damián (28 February 1944 – 7 December 1983) was a Mexican actress and producer.

Death
Cano died on 7 December 1983, in an airplane accident in Madrid, Spain. Her flight was an Iberia 727 which was about to take off for Rome in connection to final destination India,  at the same time as an Aviaco DC 9 was leaving to Santander. The aircraft collided with each other on the runway resulting in 93 deaths. She was killed in the fire after the crash. Her spouse, Sergio, was scheduled to be on the flight, but was called away on business at the last moment and was not on board.

Filmography

Una leyenda de amor (1982)
La leyenda de Rodrígo (1981)
Espejismo (1980-1981) (series)
La Güera Rodríguez (1978)
María José (1978) (series)
Zona roja (1976)
Las cautivas (1973)
Muñeca (1973) (series)
Penthouse (1973) (series)
Una mujer honesta (1972)
Los jóvenes amantes (1971)
Flor de durazno (1970)
Las cadenas del mal (1970)
Tres noches de locura (1970)
La amante perfecta (1970)
Yesenia (1970-1971) (series)
El amor y esas cosas (1969)
Un nuevo modo de amar (1968)
Rubí (1968) (series)
Un largo viaje hacia la muerte (1968)
Cómo pescar marido (1967)
Arrullo de Dios (1967)
Si quiero (1967)
Operación Secretaria (1967)
Los perversos (a go go) (1967)
Las amiguitas de los ricos (1967)
Juventud sin ley (1966)
Despedida de soltera (1966)
Los reyes del volante (1965)
Escuela para solteras (1965)
La mentira (1965) (series)
Buenas noches, año nuevo (1964)
Duelo en el desierto (1964)
El solitario (1964)
Frente al destino (1964)
Entrega inmediata (1963)
Dile que la quiero (1963)
División narcóticos (1963)
El cielo y la tierra (1962)

Producer filmography

Las cautivas (1973)
 Victoria (1972)
Una mujer honesta (1972)

External links

1944 births
1983 deaths
20th-century Mexican actresses
Actresses from Michoacán
Deaths from fire
Mexican film actresses
Mexican telenovela actresses
People from Huetamo
Victims of aviation accidents or incidents in 1983
Victims of aviation accidents or incidents in Spain